The Chippewas of Georgina Island First Nation are an Ojibwa (or Anishinaabeg) people located on Georgina Island in Lake Simcoe, Ontario, Canada. In 2008, of the First Nation's registered population of 666 people, 181 lived on, and 485 lived outside, their reserve. As of 2020, the band has a total population of 923 members. They are one of a handful of First Nations in the Toronto Census Metropolitan Area.

Geography

The First Nation has three reserves: the Chippewas of Georgina Island First Nation Indian Reserve, the Chippewas of Georgina Island First Nation 33A Indian Reserve  and the shared Chippewa Island Indian Reserve.

The main reserve consists of a small parcel of land near Virginia Beach and three islands on the southern shores of Lake Simcoe:

 Georgina Island
 Snake Island
 Fox Island

The Chippewas of Georgina Island First Nation 33A reserve is a  parcel of land separated from the mainland portion of the Chippewas of Georgina Island First Nation reserve by Black River Road and the private properties along it.

The Chippewa Island reserve is a  reserve consisting of two islands near the Moose Deer Point First Nation in Twelve Mile Bay of Georgian Bay. It is shared with the Chippewas of Rama First Nation and the Beausoleil First Nation.

Government

The reserve government consists of a five-member band council with four councillors and a Chief.

Fire and emergencies services consists of a single fire truck and ambulance. The department is staffed by two full time firefighters (one is the chief) and volunteer responders.

Policing is provided by Georgina Island Police Service with assistance from the Ontario Provincial Police. The force has three officers, and replaced the community officers from the Royal Canadian Mounted Police (primarily from Orillia Detachment and secondary from Toronto) in 1978. GIPS are part of the First Nations Police Service.

Transportation

Access to Georgina Island is by boat to and from the mainland. A marina is located on the southern tip of the island for the ferry and smaller vessels. Built in 1999, the ferry Aazhaawe can carry 18 cars and 50 passengers. Ferry service is seasonal and not provided when Lake Simcoe is frozen over. Fan boats provide access to Georgina (Fox and Snake) during the winter. Georgina Water Taxi's Ahneen provides alternate travel to Georgina Island.

There are a few paved roads on Georgina Island (nine in total) with residents using personal vehicles. There are only unpaved roads on Snake Island and no roads on Fox Island. Primary means of transport to Fox and Snake Islands is by vessels docking on private docks around the islands.

Roads are maintained by the band. There is no airport or heliport on any of the islands.

Economy

The main employers on the reserve beyond the band are geared to tourism on the island. The island has a driving range, bed and breakfast and marina facilities.

Education

Primary education (from kindergarten to Grade 6) is found at a single school, Waabgon Gamig, on Georgina Island. York Region District School Board (YRDSB) provides staffing and assistance. Students from Grades 6 to 12 are required to attend schools on the mainland with YRDSB.

Health

Basic health services are provided at the Georgina Island Health Building by local staff and medical staff visiting from York Region.

See also
Aboriginal peoples in Ontario

References

External links 
Website of the First Nation
Aboriginal Canada Portal profile of the First Nation
Chippewas of Georgina Island First Nation Land Management Code

First Nations governments in Ontario
Ojibwe governments
Ojibwe reserves in Ontario
Lake Simcoe